Zhang Yajin (born in Shanxi in 1974) is a Chinese architect and urban planner. She is one of the four partners of ISA Internationales Stadtbauatelier and its general director at the Beijing headquarters. She also works as a correspondent for the Chinese magazine Community Design.

References 

20th-century Chinese women
21st-century Chinese women
1974 births
Chinese architects
Living people
Tsinghua University alumni
University of Stuttgart alumni